Moxo (also known as Mojo, pronounced 'Moho') is any of the Arawakan languages spoken by the Moxo people of the Llanos de Moxos in northeastern Bolivia. The two extant languages of the Moxo people, Trinitario and Ignaciano, are as distinct from one another as they are from neighboring Arawakan languages. The extinct Magiana was also distinct.

Moxo languages have an active–stative syntax.

Sociolinguistic background
The languages belong to a group of tribes that originally ranged through the upper Mamoré, extending east and west from the Guapure (Itenes) to the Beni, and are now centered in the Province of Moxos, Department of Beni, Bolivia. They form part of the Mamoré-Guaporé linguistic area.

Moxo was also the primary lingua franca used in the Jesuit Missions of Moxos.

Ignaciano is used in town meetings unless outsiders are present, and it is a required subject in the lower school grades, one session per week. Perhaps half of the children learn Ignaciano. By the 1980s there were fewer than 100 monolinguals, all older than 30.

Classification
The Moxo languages are most closely related to Bauré, Pauna, and Paikonéka. Together, they form the Mamoré-Guaporé languages (named after the Mamoré River and Guaporé River). Classification by Jolkesky (2016):

Mamoré-Guaporé languages
Bauré
Bauré
Carmelito
Joaquiniano
Muxojeóne
Moxeno
Ignaciano
Trinitário
Loretano
Javierano
Paikonéka
Paikonéka
Paunáka
Paunáka

Classification by Danielsen (2011) and Danielsen & Terhart (2014: 226):

Baure languages
Bauré
Carmelito
Joaquiniano: spoken in San Joaquín
Pauna languages
Paunáka
Paikonéka
Mojo languages
Trinitário: spoken in Trinidad
Ignaciano: spoken in San Ignacio
Loretano: spoken in Loreto
Javierano: spoken in San Javier
Muchojeone

Phonology

Consonants 

 /h/ can be voiced as [ɦ] between vowels.
 /w/ can be heard as [β] before a front vowel, and as [ɥ] when preceding /j/.

Vowels 

 /e/ can also have an allophone of [ɛ].

Word lists
The following is a wordlist containing sample words from English to Moxos:

Magíana word list from the late 1700s published in Palau and Saiz (1989):

{| class="wikitable"
! Spanish gloss !! English gloss !! Magíana
|-
| bueno || good || shiomá
|-
| malo || bad || shiomallama
|-
| el padre || father || papá
|-
| la madre || mother || kay
|-
| el hermano || brother || nomasqui
|-
| uno || one || huestiche
|-
| dos || two || heravetá
|}

See also
 Indigenous languages of the Americas
 Classification of indigenous languages of the Americas
 Mesoamerican languages
 Language families and languages
 Classification of indigenous peoples of the Americas
 Indigenous peoples of the Americas
 :Category:Indigenous languages of the Americas (division into geocultural areas)
 Languages of Peru
 List of Spanish words of Indigenous American Indian origin

Further reading
Carvalho, Fernando O. de; Françoise Rose. Comparative reconstruction of Proto-Mojeño and the phonological diversification of Mojeño dialects. LIAMES, Campinas, v. 18, n. 1, p. 3–44, Jan./Jun. 2018. 
Key, Mary Ritchie. 2015. Ignaciano dictionary. In: Key, Mary Ritchie & Comrie, Bernard (eds.) The Intercontinental Dictionary Series. Leipzig: Max Planck Institute for Evolutionary Anthropology.
Gill, Ruth, and Wayne Gill. 2015. Trinitario dictionary. In: Key, Mary Ritchie & Comrie, Bernard (eds.) The Intercontinental Dictionary Series. Leipzig: Max Planck Institute for Evolutionary Anthropology.

References

External links

Ignaciano (Intercontinental Dictionary Series)
Trinitario (Intercontinental Dictionary Series)
Mojeño Trinitario DoReCo corpus compiled by Françoise Rose. Audio recordings of narrative texts with transcriptions time-aligned at the phone level, translations, and - for some texts - time-aligned morphological annotations.

Arawakan languages
Languages of Bolivia

Jesuit Missions of Moxos